Meet the Browns is a 2008 American romantic comedy-drama film released by Lionsgate on March 21, 2008. The film was based on the play of the same name by Tyler Perry and is the third film in the Madea cinematic universe. It was written and directed by Tyler Perry with Ruben Cannon helping with the writing, and starring Angela Bassett, Rick Fox, Margaret Avery, Frankie Faison, Jenifer Lewis, Lance Gross, Sofía Vergara, Lamman Rucker, Tamela Mann, Tyler Perry, and introducing David Mann as Leroy Brown. The film tells the story of a struggling single mother from Chicago who takes her children to Georgia to attend her long-lost father's funeral and meets the relatives she didn't know she had.

The film was met with mixed reviews and grossed $42 million on a budget of $20 million.

Plot
In Chicago, Brenda Brown-Davis is the struggling single mother of Mike Jr., Lena, and Tosha. She receives a letter telling her that the father she has never met has died and his funeral will be in Georgia. The same day, the plant where she works with her friend Cheryl "relocates its business to Mexico", adding to her existing financial difficulties. Then Miss Mildred, who supervises Lena in her home daycare, says she will not work for Brenda anymore due to the fact that Brenda has not been paying her.

A basketball scout named Harry notices Mike Jr. when he plays well at a game and comes to their house to talk about the boy's future. Harry asks Brenda out but she says has no interest in hearing about her son going professional and walks away. She begs Miss Mildred to watch Lena briefly and goes to see her ex with Cheryl for financial help to pay the woman back. Mike Sr., who has never given Brenda any assistance, says no and Brenda runs after Cheryl throws a brick at him.

Brenda takes her children to Georgia to attend her father's funeral and meets half-siblings who did not know she existed and are led by Cora Simmons and Leroy Brown. She is surprised to run into Harry, who lives in the same town and is friendly with her father's family members LB, Sarah, Vera, and Will. Harry does partaking in a basketball game with Mike Jr. and Will.

At dinner, Brenda learns that LB was the only one who knew about her when she shows the letter to Vera. On his deathbed, Pop confessed to LB that he had been a pimp in Chicago. Brenda's mother who was LB's mother and many of Pop's friends, the children had all known, were his working girls much to the shock of the rest of the Browns. The family welcomes Brenda, offering support and encouragement. After the funeral, they learn that Pop Brown left an old house to Brenda in his will. Brenda decides not to move into the house, despite Harry's suggestion that she should stay.

Once Brenda is back in Chicago, Mike Sr. offers money in exchange for a one-night stand. After Brenda rejects him, Mike Jr. overhears Mike Sr. insulting her and storms out. In an attempt to make money to help, Mike Jr. turns to Calvin, a friend who deals drugs. Harry sees them together and suspects something is wrong. He counsels Mike Jr. and goes home with him, to explain the situation to Brenda, who threatens to kick Mike Jr. out if he starts dealing drugs. Mike Jr. realizes the risks involved in drug dealing would let his family down and promises that he will not do it.

When Harry and Brenda leave for a date, Mike Jr. tells Calvin that he has changed his mind and returns the drugs. A group of rival drug dealers arrive and attack Calvin for selling on their turf. Michael is shot and wounded when he runs away at Calvin's urging. Cheryl informs Brenda about what happened. This leads to a further breakdown in Brenda's relationship with Mike Sr.

After Mike Jr. recovers, Harry asks the Browns for help to get Pop Brown's run-down house for Brenda and her kids; they renovate the house and surprise her. Brenda overhears Vera talking to Sarah suggesting that Harry is only dating Brenda to get his "perks" from helping Mike Jr. Brenda overhears the conversation and confronts Harry. He asserts that he truly means well, but she breaks up with him. At the same time, Cora and Leroy watch the news of a high speed chase involving their relatives Madea and Joe Simmons. As Madea is arrested and Joe flees, Leroy gives Cora money to bail her mother out.

A basketball league representative visits Brenda and offers Mike Jr. a million-dollar contract; Brenda learns that Harry referred them, and that Harry didn't ask for any money. On the day Mike Jr. signs his contract, Mike Sr. arrives to be photographed with his ex and son, but Mike Jr. announces to the press that he does not know his father, and that his mother had raised him without support.

After they leave, Mike Jr. tells his mother that Harry is a good man and more of a father figure than his actual father had been. Brenda goes to see Harry and they reconcile, ultimately leading to marriage. The Browns are seen attending Brenda and Harry's wedding.

Cast

 Angela Bassett as Brenda Brown, a struggling single mother.
 Rick Fox as Harry Belton, a basketball scout.
 David Mann as Mr. Leroy Brown, the patriarch of the Brown family in Georgia and the brother of Larry and Vera.
 Tamela Mann as Cora Simmons, the daughter of Leroy Brown.
 Margaret Avery as Sarah Brown, the wife of Larry Brown.
 Frankie Faison as Larry "L.B." Brown, the husband of Sarah, the half-brother of Brenda, and the oldest of Pop Brown's children.
 Jenifer Lewis as Vera Brown, the sister of Larry and the half-sister of Brenda who is the self-proclaimed "baby of the family".
 Lance Gross as Michael Rhodes Jr., the son of Brenda who plays basketball.
 Sofía Vergara as Cheryl Barranquilla, a friend of Brenda.
 Lamman Rucker as Will Brown, the son of Vera Brown and the nephew of Leroy Brown who is an aspiring gynecologist.
 Tyler Perry as:
 Mabel "Madea" Simmons, a tough old lady and the mother of Cora.
 Joe Simmons, the brother of Madea and uncle of Cora.
 Phillip Van Lear as Michael Rhodes Sr., the biological father of Michael Rhodes Jr.
 Kristopher Lofton as Calvin, a friend of Michael Rhodes Jr. who is a drug dealer.
 Mariana Tolbert as Lena Rhodes, the daughter of Brenda.
 Chloe Bailey as Tosha Brown, the daughter of Brenda.
 Brandon Richardson as Officer Thompson
 Irma P. Hall as Miss Mildred, Brenda's neighbor who runs a daycare.
 LaVan Davis as Henry, a bus driver.

Production
Meet the Browns completed filming on October 26, 2007, after beginning on July 12 the same year.

Stageplay
 
The film is based on certain plot points of its namesake, while majority of the storyline comes from the 2006 play, What's Done in the Dark.

Television series

Meet the Browns aired on TBS starring David Mann and Tamela Mann. The show's plot is different from the play and movie. Mr. Brown has opened up a senior citizens' home with the help of Cora, his nephew Will and his wife Sasha. Storylines involve the various zany residents of the home. The series, however, is a spin-off of the film, the stageplay and three episodes of Tyler Perry's House of Payne where Mann guest-starred as Mr. Brown, who learns that his deceased father states in his will that he wants him to open a senior citizens' home. Brown enlists the help of the Paynes, Cora, and Will. The other characters from the play and film are neither mentioned nor seen. However, Brown's sister Vera made a guest appearance in the third season of the series.

Critical reception
The film received mixed reviews from critics. Review aggregator Rotten Tomatoes gives the film a 33% approval rating based on 58 reviews, with an average rating of 4.85/10. The site's critics consensus reads: "Angela Bassett's considerable charms can't compensate for Meet the Browns incessant melodrama and scattered narrative threads." Metacritic reported the film had an average score of 45 out of 100, based on 14 reviews. Audiences polled by CinemaScore gave the film an average grade of "A" on an A+ to F scale.

Box office
In its opening weekend, the film grossed an estimated $20 million in 2,006 theaters in the United States and Canada, ranking #2 at the box office behind Horton Hears a Who!. Although the film ranked second at the box office, it ranked first in average gross per theater, grossing $9,977 per theater compared to Hortons $6,336 per theater. When the film ended its run at the box office, it had grossed $41,975,388 over its $20 million budget, making the film a success.

Soundtrack
The soundtrack was released by Atlantic Records on March 18, 2008.

Track list

People Everyday (Metamorphosis Mix) – Musiq Soulchild feat. Estelle
Face To Face – Coko & Case
Sweeter – Gerald Levert
Dig This – Brandy
I'll Take You There – Kelly Price
Love Again – Kelly Rowland
This Gift – Deborah Cox
Angel – Chaka Khan
Alright – Ledisi
Unify – Wynter Gordon
My Love – Jill Scott
Hallelujah – Tamela Mann

Blu-ray / DVD release

Tyler Perry's Meet the Browns was sold in 1-disc and 2-disc DVD and Blu-ray on July 1, 2008. DVD sales have so far gathered $17,810,803 in revenue.

References

External links
 

2008 films
2008 romantic comedy-drama films
African-American romantic comedy-drama films
African-American films
American films based on plays
Films about dysfunctional families
Films adapted into television shows
Lionsgate films
Films scored by Aaron Zigman
Films set in Atlanta
Films shot in Georgia (U.S. state)
Films set in Chicago
Films shot in Chicago
Films with screenplays by Tyler Perry
Films directed by Tyler Perry
2000s English-language films
2000s American films